Unitel may refer to:

Media and entertainment
Unitel GmbH & Co.KG, German producers and distributor of filmed classical music performances

Telecommunication companies
Unitel (Angola), an Angolan mobile phone network
Unitel Bolivia, a Bolivian television network
Unitel Communications Incorporated, a Canadian telecommunications company later known as AT&T Canada
Unitel (Mongolia), a Mongolian mobile phone network